The 1968 NCAA University Division Outdoor Track and Field Championships were contested June 13−15 at the 46th annual NCAA-sanctioned track meet to determine the individual and team national champions of men's collegiate University Division outdoor track and field events in the United States. 

This year's outdoor meet was hosted by the University of California at Edwards Stadium in Berkeley. 

USC edged out Washington State by one point in the team standings to claim their twenty-fifth national title.

Team result 
 Note: Top 10 only
 (H) = Hosts

References

NCAA Men's Outdoor Track and Field Championship
NCAA University Division Track and Field Championships
NCAA University Division Track and Field Championships
NCAA